El Maâgoula is a town and commune in the Béja Governorate, Tunisia. As of 2004 it had a total population of 7690.

See also
List of cities in Tunisia

References

Communes of Tunisia
Populated places in Béja Governorate
Cities in Tunisia
Tunisia geography articles needing translation from French Wikipedia